Cratidentium is a genus of small sea snails, marine gastropod mollusks in the family Trochidae, the top-snails.

Species
Species within the genus Cratidentium include:
 Cratidentium balteatum (Philippi, 1850)
 Cratidentium beachportense (Cotton & Godfrey, 1934)
 Cratidentium ocellinum (Hedley, 1911)
 Cratidentium rottnestense (B. R. Wilson, 1993)
 Cratidentium tiberianum (Crosse, 1863)

References

 Crosse, H., 1863. Description d'espèces nouvelles. Journal de Conchyliologie 11: 379-386
 Donald K. & Spencer H. G. (2016). Phylogenetic patterns in New Zealand and temperate Australian cantharidines (Mollusca: Gastropoda: Trochidae: Cantharidinae): trans-Tasman divergences are ancient. Molecular Phylogenetics and Evolution. 100: 333-344

External links
 

Trochidae
Gastropod genera